Kaiya June McCullough (born May 29, 1998) is an American professional soccer player who formerly played as a defender for Würzburger Kickers of the German 2. Frauen-Bundesliga. She also previously played for National Women's Soccer League (NWSL) club Washington Spirit.

Club career

Washington Spirit
Washington Spirit drafted McCullough with the 32nd overall pick in the 2020 NWSL College Draft. She subsequently signed with the team on February 10, 2020.

On September 7, 2020, Washington Spirit announced that they have waived McCullough so that she could pursue opportunities overseas. It later became known that a large part of her exit was motivated by verbal abuse and racism she faced under coach Richie Burke.

Personal life and activism
Following former NFL quarterback Colin Kaepernick, McCullough has been kneeling during the US National Anthem to protest police brutality and racism since 2017.

Since joining the NWSL, McCullough has been one of the most vocal players against racism in the league. She had a large role in organizing the league players' support for Black Lives Matter, especially during the 2020 NWSL Challenge Cup.

In August 2021, McCullough was joined by many former Washington Spirit teammates with allegations of abuse against coach Richie Burke. McCullough described Burke as belligerent and aggressive, and also claimed he made many racist and otherwise bigoted comments towards her and her teammates. The Washington Spirit fired Burke in September. Burke's firing amidst the 2021 NWSL abuse scandal put into question the abusive behaviors of many coaches in the NWSL and worldwide, and played a large role in the ousting of League Commissioner Lisa Baird.

References

External links
 
 
 Kaiya McCullough at UCLA Bruins

1998 births
Living people
American women's soccer players
Women's association football defenders
Washington Spirit players
UCLA Bruins women's soccer players
Würzburger Kickers players
American expatriate soccer players in Germany
Washington Spirit draft picks
American expatriate women's soccer players